Carex pseudocyperus is a species of flowering plant in the sedge family known by the common name cyperus sedge or hop sedge. It grows in marshes, swamps, and the margins of ponds, rivers and canals.

References

pseudocyperus
Plants described in 1753
Taxa named by Carl Linnaeus